The Australian butterfly ray (Gymnura australis) is a species of butterfly ray, family Gymnuridae.

References

 

Gymnura
Fish described in 1886